HGI may refer to:

 Croatian Civic Initiative
 Hardgrove Grindability Index
 Home Gateway Initiative
 Houston Galveston Institute